Hello Darlin' may refer to:

Hello Darlin' (album), an album by Conway Twitty
"Hello Darlin' (song)", a single from this album
Hello Darlin' (book), a 2001 autobiography by Larry Hagman

See also
Hello Darling